Mount Morgan is a  high mountain in the West Antarctic Marie Byrd Land.

The United States Antarctic Service discovered and mapped it during its 1939-1941 expedition. The Advisory Committee on Antarctic Names named the mountain in 1966 after Charles Gill Morgan (1906-1980), a geologist in the second Antarctic expedition (1933-1935) of the US polar explorer Richard Evelyn Byrd.

References

Mountains of Marie Byrd Land